Hangeland is a surname. Notable people with the surname include:

Brede Hangeland (born 1981), Norwegian footballer
Siri Hangeland (born 1952), Norwegian feminist, civic leader and politician

Norwegian-language surnames